Natsuiro High School: Seishun Hakusho is an open world video game released on June 4, 2015, by D3 Publisher for PlayStation 3 and PlayStation 4. D3 Publisher officially describes the game as an "open world high school love adventure".

Gameplay
The player is able to explore the island. On many occasions, the player will find people that will give them quests, mostly to take pictures of schoolgirls' panties for a journalism club. If the player is seen doing so, they will be reported to the police, initiating a pursuit phase, where the player has to evade the police. If caught, the player will be taken into custody in a police station or the school counsellor's office, depending on where the player was caught.

Development
Natsuiro Haisukuru: Seishun Hakusho was announced in November 20, 2014's Weekly Famitsu. About a week later, D3 Publisher released details about the main outline and four of its heroines. In the December 4, 2014's Weekly Famitsu they revealed three new female characters. On December 10, 2014, D3 Publisher uploaded the first trailer on their official YouTube channel, revealing the theme song  by Megu & Tamaki. In February 2015, the release date, thirteen new characters and their voice actors were revealed. An eight-minute trailer was released on May 15, 2015. Natsuiro Haisukuru Seishun Hakusho was inspired by action role-playing open world game The Elder Scrolls V: Skyrim. The game's producer is Nobuyuki Okajima.

Music
The two songs were released alongside the game on June 4, 2015 on a double A-side single.

Reception and sales

Reviewers from the Japanese video game magazine Famitsu scored Natsuiro Haisukuru: Seishun Hakusho a 30 out of 40, based on individual scores of 8, 8, 8, and 6.
The PlayStation 4 and PlayStation 3 versions respectively debuted at number three (13,868 units) and number 10 (6,772 units) on Japanese sales charts during their release week. The PlayStation 4 version topped the Japanese PlayStation Network digital download sales chart during its release week, while the PlayStation 3 version debuted at number four.

Notes

References

External links
 

High school-themed video games
Single-player video games
D3 Publisher games
Open-world video games
PlayStation 3 games
PlayStation 4 games
Stealth video games
Strategy video games
2015 video games
Video games developed in Japan
Video games set on fictional islands
Bishōjo games
Japan-exclusive video games
Action-adventure games